Bundewallah is a locality in the City of Shoalhaven in New South Wales, Australia. It lies to the north of the Kangaroo Valley Road to the northwest of Berry.

References

City of Shoalhaven
Localities in New South Wales